Marianne Jahn-Nutt (born 14 December 1942) is a retired Austrian alpine skier. She won two gold medals at the 1962 World Championships, in the slalom and giant slalom events. She competed at the 1960 and 1964 Winter Olympics with the best result of 13th place in the giant slalom in 1964.

References

External links

1942 births
Living people
Austrian female alpine skiers
Olympic alpine skiers of Austria
Alpine skiers at the 1960 Winter Olympics
Alpine skiers at the 1964 Winter Olympics
Sportspeople from Vorarlberg
20th-century Austrian women
21st-century Austrian women